Hoxie is a surname. Notable people with the surname include:

 Al Hoxie (1901–1982), American film actor
 Andrew Hoxie (born 1986), American professional soccer player
 Charles A. Hoxie (1867–1941), American scientist
 Herbert Melville Hoxie (1830-1886), American pioneer, abolitionist, railroad executive 
 Jack Hoxie (1885–1965), American rodeo rider and actor
 Jean Hoxie (1898–1970), American tennis player and coach
 John Randolph Hoxie (1831–1896), American politician and business person
 Joseph C. Hoxie (1814-1870), American architect
 R. Gordon Hoxie (1919–2002), American educator and college administrator
 Robert F. Hoxie (1868–1916), American economist
 Richard L. Hoxie (1844–1930), American brigadier general